The 2006–07 season was Brighton & Hove Albion's 105th year in existence and first season in League One after being relegated from the Championship. Mark McGhee began the season as manager, but after losing three consecutive matches he left the club on 8 September 2006. McGhee was succeeded as manager by youth coach and former Seagulls player Dean Wilkins, who steered the side to an 18th-placed finish.

Squad

Left club during season

Results

League One

References

2006-07
Brighton and Hove Albion